The FIBA Oceania Championship for Women 1974 was the qualifying tournament of FIBA Oceania for the 1975 FIBA World Championship for Women in Colombia. Australia won the series 3–0 to win the first Oceania Championship.

Results

References

International basketball competitions hosted by New Zealand
Australia women's national basketball team games
New Zealand women's national basketball team games
October 1974 sports events in New Zealand
1974 in New Zealand sport